Ridge Prairie is an unincorporated community in Saline County, in the U.S. state of Missouri.

History
A post office called Ridge Prairie was established in 1846, and remained in operation until 1907. The community was named for a prairie near the original town site.

References

Unincorporated communities in Saline County, Missouri
Unincorporated communities in Missouri